James H. Schwartz (born January 29, 1928) was an American politician in the state of Iowa.

Schwartz was born in Ottumwa, Iowa. He attended Creighton University and worked in the insurance industry. He served in the Iowa House of Representatives from 1969 to 1973 as a Democrat.

References 

1928 births
Living people
Democratic Party members of the Iowa House of Representatives
Creighton University alumni
People from Ottumwa, Iowa